"Trouble's Coming" is a song by English rock band Royal Blood, the opening track on their third studio album, Typhoons (2021). It was released as the album's lead single on 24 September 2020. It reached No. 8 in Scotland and No. 46 in the United Kingdom. On Billboard genre-specific charts, it reached No. 1 on the Canada Rock chart and No. 29 on the US Hot Rock & Alternative Songs chart.

Promotion
On 21 September 2020, the band released a short clip of the song on their Instagram page, before releasing the song in its entirety on 24 September. The song was later used in the soundtracks for Dirt 5, FIFA 21, NHL 21, and Forza Horizon 5. The song was used in the second season in the  Netflix series Locke & Key.

On 19 November 2020, the band performed the song on The Late Late Show with James Corden.

Critical reception
Alex Mace of Platform Magazine reviewed the song positively, giving it an 8.5/10 rating. Mace described the song as a "big, glossy dance jam", and that the song was "[p]roof that Royal Blood can indeed do something different and do it well". Jon Blistein of Rolling Stone and Ben Kaye of Consequence of Sound both noted the dance influences in Trouble's Coming, with Blistein describing the song as the band injecting "a bit of dancefloor energy into their hard rock sound", and Kaye describing the song as a "dance floor stomper".

Music video
The music video for "Trouble's Coming" was premiered on 23 October 2020 and was directed by Dir. Lx.

Track listing

Charts

Weekly charts

Year-end charts

References 

2020 singles
2020 songs
Royal Blood (band) songs